Mr. Love is a 1985 British comedy film directed by Roy Battersby and starring Barry Jackson, Maurice Denham and Margaret Tyzack. It was made by Goldcrest Films.

Its budget was £486,000. (Another account says £1.1 million.) Goldcrest Films invested the £486,000 and received £330,000, recording a loss of £156,000.

Plot
A mild-mannered gardener becomes a lovable legend in his town for his talent to romantically please every woman that fancies him.

Production
The film was filmed at several notable locations in England, mainly in Southport, Merseyside and at Phoenix Cinema in East Finchley.

Gallery

Cast
 Barry Jackson as Donald Lovelace
 Marcia Warren as Doris Lovelace
 Maurice Denham as Theo
 Margaret Tyzack as Pink Lady
 Linda Marlowe as Barbara
 Christina Collier as Esther
 Helen Cotterill as Lucy Nuttall
 Donal McCann as Leo
 Jacki Piper as Ida
 Patsy Byrne as Mrs Lunt
 Kay Stonham as Maggie Capstick
 Alan Starkey as Landau man
 Tony Melody as Ferris
 Lill Roughley as Housewife
 Julia Deakin as Melanie

References

External links

1985 films
1985 comedy films
British comedy films
1980s English-language films
1980s British films